Pechatniki may refer to:
Pechatniki District, a raion of the South-Eastern Administrative Okrug.
Pechatniki (Lyublinsko-Dmitrovskaya line), a Moscow Metro station on Line 10.
 Pechatniki (Bolshaya Koltsevaya line), a prospective Moscow Metro station on Line 11.